University of New South Wales Cricket Club is a cricket club associated with the University of New South Wales, New South Wales, Australia. They are also known as the Bumble Bees and play in the Sydney Grade Cricket competition. They were founded in 1951, beginning in the Municipal and Sydney Shires Cricket competition and entered the Sydney Grade Cricket competition in 1973.

In the current season, 2018 to 2019, UNSWCC has fielded five graded sides plus one in the Metropolitan Cup competition, which is akin to 6th grade. It also has a First Grade Limited over plus T20 sides. In addition to these, Poidevin-Gray and A.W. Green Shield sides represent the UNSWCC and are development pathways for emerging young talent. The University offers a range of scholarships for commencing students who are involved in the club, "both on and off the field".

Notable players 
In the club's history, there have been several notable players. These include:

 Tom Cooper
 Murray Creed
 Daniel Christian
 David Dawson
 Tim Lang
 Geoffrey 'Henry' Lawson
 Katie Mack
 Michael Slater
 Chris Tremain

See also
 History of Australian cricket

References

External links
 

Sydney Grade Cricket clubs
University of New South Wales student organisations
Cricket clubs established in 1973
1973 establishments in Australia
University and college sports clubs in Australia